Paul Preiss (born June 9, 1980, in Port Huron, Michigan) is an American actor, model, director and producer.

After graduating from college, Paul Preiss moved to New York City and worked as a model for three years in USA and Europe. He was signed to IMG Models agency.

Moving to Los Angeles, he aspired for an acting career and ended up playing lead role in three feature films, most notably in lead roles as Nate Merritt in Damion Dietz's 2008 film Dog Tags and Ryan in The Legend of Bloody Mary. He resides in Venice, California.

Preiss has also directed advertisements for Levi's and Nike.

Biography 
Originally from Port Huron, Michigan, Paul headed to NYC after graduating from college. He was immediately signed as a model with the acclaimed modeling agency, IMG. He worked as a model in NYC and Europe for three years before discovering his love and passion for acting.

Never shying away from a road trip, Paul packed his bags and drove across the country to pursue his dreams in Los Angeles. Within his first year in Hollywood, Paul has played the lead in three feature films. He just wrapped production on the independent feature Dog Tags playing a troubled marine on a path to find the father he never knew.

Paul resides in Venice, CA with his black lab "Sunny".

Filmography

References

External links
 
 Official YouTube Channel

1980 births
Living people
American male film actors
Male models from Michigan
People from Port Huron, Michigan
Male actors from Michigan